The Ostrava metropolitan area is the metropolitan area with the city of Ostrava in the Czech Republic at its center. The Ostrava urban area is the largest urban area in the metropolitan area with a population of 365,000. The metropolitan area corresponds to the administrative Moravian-Silesian Region. The population of the metropolitan area is 983,000 according to the European Spatial Planning Observation Network. An alternative definition, the Eurostat Larger Urban Zone, lists a population of 1,153,876. The Ostrava metropolitan area is sometimes combined with the Silesian metropolitan area to form a wider urban region with a population of 5,294,000.

References

Metropolitan areas of the European Union
Populated places in the Moravian-Silesian Region